Smoko is a locality in north east Victoria, Australia. The town "gained its name in the 1850s because gold seekers regularly stopped here for a smoke and a rest on their way to and from the goldfields".

References

External links

Towns in Victoria (Australia)
Alpine Shire